Lauren Bittner is an American actress.

Life and career
Bittner was born in New York City. She is best known for her role as Julie in Paranormal Activity 3. Bittner has also appeared in The Thing About My Folks, Flannel Pajamas, Gardener of Eden, Bride Wars, The Mighty Macs, and Subject: I Love You.

Bittner was cast as a series regular on the Lifetime drama series Secret Lives of Wives.

Filmography

References

External links
 

American film actresses
American television actresses
Living people
Actresses from New York City
21st-century American actresses
Year of birth missing (living people)